The 1909 Central Michigan Normalites football team represented Central Michigan Normal School, later renamed Central Michigan University, as an independent during the 1909 college football season. In their first season under head coachHarry Helmer, the Central Michigan football team compiled a 4–3 record and outscored their opponents by a combined total of 63 to 58.

The team's roster included quarterback Wallace Coutant, halfbacks Emmet Houlihan and Earl McCarty, fullback Ford Bradish, ends Ralph Gilpin and Ollie Richards, guards William Ochs, Alexander Perkins, and Leo Going, tackles Rollie Moody and Floyd L. Livermore, end/fullback George Parkhill, and guard/tackle Harold Spross.

Schedule

References

Central Michigan
Central Michigan Chippewas football seasons
Central Michigan Normalites football